Abderrahim Moum (born 18 September 2000) is a Moroccan weightlifter.

Career 
Moum was a three-time bronze medalist in the under 73 kg category at the 2021 African Weightlifting Championships in Nairobi. He represented Morocco at the 2020 Summer Olympics in Tokyo, competing at the Men 73kg event and ranking 14th.

References

External links 
 
 
 
 

Living people
2000 births
Moroccan male weightlifters
Weightlifters at the 2020 Summer Olympics
Olympic weightlifters of Morocco
African Weightlifting Championships medalists
21st-century Moroccan people